Eupithecia canchasae is a moth in the family Geometridae. It is found in the region Santiago (Santiago Province) in Chile. The habitat consists of the Central Valley Biotic Province.

The length of the forewings is about 7.5 mm for males. Adults have been recorded on wing in December.

Etymology
The specific name is based on the type locality.

References

Moths described in 1987
canchasae
Moths of South America
Endemic fauna of Chile